Can't Take Me Home is the debut studio album by American singer and songwriter Pink. It was released on April 4, 2000, by LaFace Records in the United States. The album produced three singles—"There You Go", "Most Girls", and "You Make Me Sick"—and peaked at number 26 on the US Billboard 200. The production on the album includes Kevin "She'kspere" Briggs, Babyface, Kandi Burruss, Terence "Tramp Baby" Abney, Daryl Simmons, and Tricky. Pink shared co-writing credit on seven of the album's tracks. This album was described by AllMusic as "skittering, post-jungle rhythm for the bedrock of these savvy, club-ready dance-pop productions – a sound exploited expertly on TLC's record".

Critical reception

Can't Take Me Home received mixed to positive reviews from music critics. AllMusic gave the album positive review, giving it four out of five stars. Robert Christgau also gave a positive review, grading it B+. Entertainment Weekly gave the album a mixed review, grading it C+. Jam! and MTV Asia also gave mixed reviews; the latter gave album the grade five out of ten. NME gave a positive review on the album, grading it six out of ten. Q also gave a positive review, giving it the same grade as AllMusic, four out of five stars. Rolling Stone gave a mixed review, giving it two and a half out of five stars.

Track listing

Notes
 signifies a vocal producer
 signifies a co-producer

Sample credits
"Let Me Let You Know" contains elements from "Cease the Bombing", written by Neal Creque, performed by Grant Greene.

Personnel

 Pink – vocals
 Terence "Tramp Baby" Abney – keyboards, producer, drum programming
 Babyface – producer
 Harold Frasier – producer, keyboards
 Steve "Rhythm" Clarke – producer, drum programming
 Will Baker – vocal arrangement
 Steve Baughman – assistant
 Kerren Berz – strings, string arrangements
 Elliot Blakely – assistant
 Paul Boutin – engineer
 Jason Boyd – arranger
 Kandi Burruss – producer, backing vocals
 Josh Butler – engineer
 Ralph Cacciurri – assistant
 Chris Champion – engineer
 Rob Chiarelli – mixing
 Chrissy Conway – backing vocals
 Lysa Cooper – stylist
 Sharon A. Daley – A&R
 Regina Davenport – artist coordination
 Kevin "KD" Davis – mixing
 Blake Eiseman – engineer
 Daniela Federici – photography
 Paul Foley – engineer
 Sherree Ford-Payne – backing vocals
 John Frye – engineer

Charts

Weekly charts

Year-end charts

Certifications

Media appearances
"You Make Me Sick" was featured in the 2001 film and the soundtrack for Save the Last Dance. "Split Personality", which was not released as a single, was featured in the 2001 film The Princess Diaries.

References

2000 debut albums
Albums produced by Tricky Stewart
Pink (singer) albums
LaFace Records albums